Mangelia woodwardiae is a species of sea snail, a marine gastropod mollusk in the family Mangeliidae.

Description
The length of the shell attains 9 mm, its diameter 4 mm.

The small, whitish shell has a broadened fusiform shape. It contains 7 whorls, of which two vitreous and globular whorls in the protoconch. The shell shows a conspicuous central acute angle in the lower whorls. The whorls are longitudinally crossed by thickish oblique ribs (8 on the body whorl) and intersected by few spiral lirae. The narrow aperture is oblong . The outer lip is invrassate. The columellar margin is straight at its base. The sinus is very obscure. The siphonal canal is hardly produced.

Distribution
This marine species occurs in the Persian Gulf.

References

External links
  Tucker, J.K. 2004 Catalog of recent and fossil turrids (Mollusca: Gastropoda). Zootaxa 682:1-1295.
 

woodwardiae
Gastropods described in 1917